The Sleeping Tracks is an EP Album of post-rock band Inspirative, released in 2009

Track listing 
 Why- old school version] - 6:03
 Antraes - 2:16
 WindChimes - 5:48

2009 EPs